Robert Bryce (born 1960) is an American author and journalist in Austin, Texas. His articles on energy, politics, and other topics have appeared in numerous publications, including the New York Times, Washington Post, Wall Street Journal, Forbes, Real Clear Energy, Counterpunch, and National Review.

Career
Bryce has been writing about the energy business for three decades. He spent twelve years writing for The Austin Chronicle. From 2006 to 2010, he was the managing editor of the online magazine, Energy Tribune. From October 2007 to February 2008 he was a fellow at the Institute for Energy Research. From 2010 to 2019 he was a Senior Fellow at the Manhattan Institute.

Other works

Writing on the Energy Industry and Species Protection

Bryce has written frequently about the in-feasibility of the United States becoming energy independent.

In March 2009, he testified before the Senate Committee on Energy and Natural Resources to discuss the limits inherent in renewable energy, saying "no matter how you do the calculations, renewable energy by itself, can not, will not, be able to replace hydrocarbons over the next two to three decades, and that's a conservative estimate".

In an opinion piece in the Wall Street Journal in March 2009 he denounced the energy policies of former United States President George W. Bush and the current president Barack Obama, claiming their rush for renewable energy will not be sufficient to cover the country's future energy needs.

Bryce has criticized special exceptions to wildlife protection laws given to renewable energy facilities in the United States. Oil producers and electric utilities have repeatedly been charged and fined under the Migratory Bird Treaty Act for killing birds; meanwhile, wind-power companies are not prosecuted despite routine violations of the MBTA. In the Wall Street Journal, he wrote,

Yet there is one group of energy producers that are not being prosecuted for killing birds: wind-power companies. And wind-powered turbines are killing a vast number of birds every year. A July 2008 study of the wind farm at Altamont Pass California, estimated that its turbines kill an average of 80 golden eagles per year. The study, funded by the Alameda County Community Development Agency, also estimated that about 10,000 birds—nearly all protected by the migratory bird act—are being whacked every year at Altamont.

He also wrote about the health problems caused by low-frequency noise emitted from wind turbines.

In June 2010, in an article for Slate he expressed dismay at the corn ethanol industry's attempts to use the blowout of the Macondo well in the Gulf of Mexico as an basis to pursue more subsidies.

Bryce is an advocate for increased shale gas consumption in the US. In a June 13, 2011 piece published in the Wall Street Journal he posited that the "shale revolution now underway is the best news for North American energy since the discovery of the East Texas Field in 1930."

Bryce opposes federal corn subsidies for ethanol, citing high costs.

He has argued that electric vehicles have failed to date due to the lack of energy density in batteries, safety concerns, and relatively few sales.

N2N
Bryce recently argued that renewable energy remains unready to meet real-world energy needs at a scale that can save the climate.

Accordingly, he has long favored "N2N" (natural gas to nuclear), as the logical way forward for energy policy and insurance against the potential risk of climate change.

Carbon Capture and Sequestration
In May 2010, he published an op-ed in The New York Times that underscored the difficulties associated with large-scale carbon capture and sequestration. He has recently extended this line of argument in National Review Online

Writings on Politics and Current Events

George W. Bush
In 1993, Bryce wrote a piece for the Christian Science Monitor about George W. Bush's jump into the Texas gubernatorial race arguing that Bush would "pose a formidable challenge" to then Democratic Governor Ann Richards.  Bryce also referred to Karl Rove a "savvy political consultant."

Bryce predicted that Bush would win the White House in a 1999 piece for The Austin Chronicle, and was the first journalist to report on how Bush's ownership of the Texas Rangers would become a financial asset.

Bryce also analyzed how Bush and his partners used the power of eminent domain to profit off of land they did not own.

"I am Sullied-No More"
In 2007, Bryce featured 44-year-old Colonel Theodore S. Westhusing's suicide note in an article for the Texas Observer titled, "I am Sullied-No More." In it he argues that Westhusing chose death over dishonor while faced with the Iraq war's corruption.

Funeral industry
In 1999, Bryce wrote about corruption in the funeral industry, reporting on how Robert Waltrip, C.E.O of the world's largest death-care company, Service Corporation International "used the [Texas] governor's office and a state senator in an effort to crush an investigation into S.C.I.'s operations."

V-22 Tiltrotor
Bryce has been an outspoken critic of the troubled V-22 tiltrotor, or Osprey, for its safety and cost record.

Controversy

In October 2011 a petition was addressed to The New York Times complaining about Bryce. It asked the paper's public editor, Arthur Brisbane, to address the issue of how op-ed writers are identified and asked that the paper be more transparent with regard to any financial support the op-ed writers may get from various industries.
On October 29, 2011, Brisbane responding to the petition, writing "I don't think Mr. Bryce is masquerading as anything: experts generally have a point of view". Regarding the issue of funding from energy-related interests, Brisbane wrote that "the Manhattan Institute's dependence on this category of funding is slight – about 2.5 percent of its budget over the past 10 years."

In June 2013, TheAutoChannel.com published a 60-page rebuttal of Robert Bryce's "Gusher of Lies" written by Marc J. Rauch, co-founder of The Auto Channel. The rebuttal challenges Mr. Bryce's negative claims about ethanol. Mr. Bryce has not responded to Rauch's criticisms.

Published books

 Power Hungry: The Myths of "Green" Energy and the Real Fuels of the Future, published 2010 by PublicAffairs, .
 Gusher of Lies: The Dangerous Delusions of Energy Independence, published by PublicAffairs 2008, .
 Cronies: Oil, the Bushes, and the rise of Texas, America's Superstate, published by PublicAffairs in 2004, .
 Pipe Dreams: Greed, Ego, and the Death of Enron, published by PublicAffairs in 2002, .

References

External links

 Robert Bryce on Sourcewatch
 Personal website of Robert Bryce
 Documentary JUICE THE MOVIE

American male journalists
American non-fiction environmental writers
Writers from Austin, Texas
Living people
Manhattan Institute for Policy Research
1960 births